is a Japanese model and actor who is affiliated with Vithmic Co., Ltd.

Biography 
Mario Kuroba was born in Miyagi Prefecture, Japan in 1993. In 2010, he won second place in the 23rd Junon Superboy Contest and received the AGF award, kick-starting his career. 

In 2012, he made his acting debut as Eiji Kikumaru (7th generation) in Musical: The Prince of Tennis, appearing in the same role until November 2014. He was later cast as Mikazuki Munechika in the Touken Ranbu musicals and as Ryota Kise in the Kuroko's Basketball stage play adaptations.

Personal life
In high school, he was classmates with Japanese actor Toman. He married actress Yuki Sakurai on 11 January 2022.

Filmography

Theater

Films

Television

References

External links 

 Official agency profile 
 Official site 

1993 births
Living people
Actors from Miyagi Prefecture
21st-century Japanese male actors
Japanese male stage actors
Japanese television personalities